Richard Everard may refer to:

Sir Richard Everard, 1st Baronet, of Ballyboy (died c. 1660) of the Everard baronets 
Sir Richard Everard, 1st Baronet, of Much Waltham (died c.1680)
Sir Richard Everard, 2nd Baronet (c. 1625–1694), member of parliament for Westminster
Sir Richard Everard, 4th Baronet (c. 1683–1733), proprietary governor of North Carolina
Sir Richard Everard, 5th Baronet (died 1742) of the Everard baronets